The 1986 Virginia Slims of Chicago was a women's tennis tournament played on indoor carpet courts at the UIC Pavilion in Chicago, Illinois in the United States and was part of the 1986 WTA Tour. It was the 15th edition of the tournament and was held from November 10 through November 16, 1986. First-seeded Martina Navratilova won the singles title, her seventh in total at the event, and earned $33,000 first-prize money.

Finals

Singles
 Martina Navratilova defeated  Hana Mandlíková 7–5, 7–5
 It was Navratilova's 13th singles title of the year and the 124th of her career.

Doubles
 Claudia Kohde-Kilsch /  Helena Suková defeated  Steffi Graf /  Gabriela Sabatini 6–7(5–7), 7–6(7–5), 6–3

References

External links
 International Tennis Federation (ITF) tournament edition details
 Tournament draws

Virginia Slims of Chicago
Ameritech Cup
Virginia Slims of Chicago
Virginia Slims of Chicago
Virginia Slims of Chicago